The 2016 Imperial Basketball City Tournament was a four nation international basketball tournament held in Bologna, Italy. All matches of the tournament scheduled from 25 to 26 June 2016 was hosted at the Land Rover Arena.

The tournament follows a Single-elimination tournament with the winners of the initial two matches to contest at the final and the losers to participate at the 3rd place match.

Results
Times listed are local (UTC+2:00)

Semifinals

Third place match

Final

References

International basketball competitions hosted by Italy
2015–16 in Italian basketball
2015–16 in Canadian basketball
2015–16 in Chinese basketball
2015–16 in Philippine basketball
Sport in Bologna